is a 1974 martial arts film and the second in a series starting with The Street Fighter starring Sonny Chiba. In this sequel, Martial artist Takuma (Terry) Tsurugi returns to take on a Yakuza family that may be embezzling money from charities to finance their own operations. Both the police and the Yakuza find themselves battling Tsurugi, but Tsurugi's fight ultimately is with the mob, and he concentrates on them.

The film was initially released on home video by MGM/CBS Home Video and later by New Line Home Video.

Shout! Factory acquired the license of all three films in the series for a Blu-ray release on February 19, 2019 via their Shout! Selects line.

Cast
Note: English-translated names, if given or known, will be in parentheses:
 Shinichi (Sonny) Chiba - Takuma (Terry) Tsurugi
 Yōko Ichiji - Pin Boke (Kitty)
 Masafumi Suzuki - Kendō Masaoka
 Kaoru Nakajima - Kazuko Masaoka
 Naoki Shima (Zulu Yachi) - Shichirō Yamagami
 Masashi (Milton) Ishibashi - Tateki (Junjo) Shikenbaru
 Hiroshi Tanaka - Isamu Ōtaguro
 Katsuya Yamashita - Imura
 Masagorō Koizumi - Fujimura
 Masataka Iwao - Masuda
 Lín Xùn-Měi - Tateishi
 Kazuyuki Saitō - Kuroda
 Kuniaki Nukui - Katō
 Keisuke Handa - Takutoshi
 Claude Gagnon - Don Costello
 Yoshiki Yamada - Inspector Fujisaki
 Shunji Sasaki - Police Clerk
 Michimaro Otabe - Shinsei (Rising Sun) Construction Manager
 Shingo Yamashiro - Man in Sauna

References

External links
 
 
 Goo Movies 

1974 films
1970s action films
1970s Japanese films
1970s Japanese-language films
Films directed by Shigehiro Ozawa
Films set in Tokyo
Japanese action films
Japanese sequel films
Karate films
Toei Company films
The Street Fighter